Blue Prize (foaled August 26, 2013) is a retired Argentinian Thoroughbred racehorse and the winner of the 2019 Breeders' Cup Distaff.

Career

Blue Prize's first race and only start as a two-year-old was on May 30, 2016, at Hipódromo Argentino de Palermo, where she came in first.

Blue Prize finished second in her first two starts at age three. On October 10, 2016, she won the Grade-1 Argentinian Gran Premio Seleccion. She was named Argentina's champion three-year-old filly.

She was sold to Merriebelle Stable in 2017 and was relocated to the United States where she made her first start on June 11 with a second-place finish at Churchill Downs. She then came in second place three more times in a row.

On October 8, 2017, she came in third place at the Grade-1 Spinster Stakes. She finally captured her first American graded win by winning the Grade-2 Falls City Handicap on November 23 to close out his 2017 season.

She had a strong 2018 season. She won the Top Flight Handicap, the Fleur de Lis Handicap, the Locust Grove Handicap and the Grade-1 Spinster Stakes. She closed the season out with a 4th-place finish at the Grade-1 Breeders' Cup Distaff on November 13.

Blue Prize started her 2019 season with a third-place finish in the La Troienne Stakes at Churchill Downs on May 3. She tried to defend her Fleur de Lis Handicap crown in June, but came in second. She then finished third in the July 13 Delaware Handicap.

Blue Prize's 2019 season picked up though in August with a win at the Summer Colony Stakes at Saratoga. This was the first of a three race win streak. Her next win came on October 6 when she successfully defended her Spinster Stakes title at Keeneland. On November 2, she finished out the 2019 season with a win at the Grade-1 Breeders' Cup Distaff, beating Midnight Bisou.

Blue Prize was sold for $5,000,000 and retired in November 2019. She will be bred to Into Mischief.

Racing statistics 

An asterisk after the odds means Blue Prize was the post time favorite

Pedigree

References

2013 racehorse births
Racehorses bred in Argentina
Racehorses trained in Argentina
Racehorses trained in the United States
Breeders' Cup Distaff winners